The 1977 NCAA Men's Division I Outdoor Track and Field Championships were contested May 31−June 4 at the 55th annual NCAA-sanctioned track meet to determine the individual and team national champions of men's collegiate Division I outdoor track and field events in the United States. 

This year's meet was hosted at Memorial Stadium at the University of Illinois in Champaign. 

Arizona State finished fourteen points ahead of UTEP  in the team standings and captured their first national title.

Team result 
 Note: Top 10 only
 (H) = Hosts

References

NCAA Men's Outdoor Track and Field Championship
NCAA Division I Outdoor Track and Field Championships
NCAA
NCAA Division I Outdoor Track and Field Championships
NCAA Division I Outdoor Track and Field Championships